Leif Eriksen may refer to:

 Leif Eriksen (bandy) (1918–2012), Norwegian bandy player
 Leif Herbrand Eriksen (1921–2009), Norwegian journalist and politician
 Leif Eriksen (footballer, born 1909), Norwegian football striker
 Leif Eriksen (footballer, born 1940), Norwegian football striker

See also
 Leif Erikson (c. 970–c. 1020), Norse explorer from Iceland